Yelverton is a village and civil parish in the English county of Norfolk, situated some  south east of Norwich and closely associated with Alpington.

The villages name probably means 'Geldfrith's farm/settlement'.

For the purposes of local government, the parish falls within the district of South Norfolk.

The village itself is just south of the A146 (on which lies Yelverton Garage) and is contiguous with Alpington to the south with which it shares its facilities, which include a  duckpond, village hall and St. Mary's church.

References

Notes
 Ordnance Survey (2005). OS Explorer Map OL40 - The Broads. .
 Office for National Statistics & Norfolk County Council (2001). Census population and household counts for unparished urban areas and all parishes. Retrieved 2 December 2005.

External links
 Community website for Alpington and Yelverton
St. Mary's Church
 
Yelverton on GENUKI
.

South Norfolk
Villages in Norfolk
Civil parishes in Norfolk